"Tilley Landed On Our Shore" is a 1969 Australian television play. It was part of the Australian Plays series.

Plot
A comic account of Governor Phillips's 1788 landing in Australia. It is set in the modern day on  the mythical island of Extrania, where  Lieut. Tilley has   been sent to establish a penal colony.

Cast
Donald MacDonald as Lt Tilly
Michael Boddy
Frank Lloyd
Tom Farley
David Cameron
Ric Hutton
Noel Ferrier
Ruth Cracknell
Don Crosby
Barry Lovett
Lou Vernon
Edward Howell
Pat Bishop
Jack Allen
Tony Bazell 		
Reg Collins 		
John Gray 		
Ric Hunter 		
Sheila Kennelly 		
Colonel   Crint and   His   Regiment   of   Foot and Mouth Deserters.

Production
Before the production aired, the script won the 1967 Dame Mary Gilmore Medal awarded in March 1968. Judges called it "a superbly funny comment with a strong Australian history allegory on present attitudes to domestic and foreign affairs. A rare dramatic event — a satirical script. It has style in the best sense of the word. It hides unexpected social comment beneath well-constructed fun. The humour is visual as well as verbal, the TV medium is an integral part of its being."

It was the first self contained drama by the ABC to be shot entirely on film with no videotaped segments. More than thirty people were in the cast and above-the-line costs were estimated to be somewhere between $15,000 and  $20,000.

Reception
The Sydney Morning Herald said "never have so many done to much for so little. It was a laboured hour of TV. There is only one word for it. Ouch." The same paper later called the production one of the worst shows of 1969.

The play has been re-appraised in later years. Academic Susan Lever wrote:
On my first viewing I was appalled by the slow pace and sheer crudity of this television offering. Its low budget is evident in every aspect, and every actor (with the exception of Ruth Cracknell and possibly Donald McDonald) milk every line for any possibility of humour. With further viewings, though, I find it clever and experimental—at least, it’s evidence that there was more than ‘naturalism’ on television in the early decades. At the same time, there’s not a trace of that ‘it could be you’ identification with the audience; nor any claims for documentary accuracy whatever... It’s clearly based in the tradition of satirical revue, but it is more sustained and serious than the sketch comedies that now constitute television’s version of that tradition.

References

External links
 

1960s Australian television plays
1969 Australian television episodes
1969 television plays
Australian Plays (season 1) episodes